Borki Lock – the third lock on the Augustów Canal (from the Biebrza) and is located in Poland. It was completely destroyed during WW II and was rebuilt in 1948.

Rebuilt from the ground up in 1948 after the war. Concrete, single chamber. The lockable steel gates wspornymi, inflated circulation through the channels.

Manual drive. Max declined 3.19 m.
 Location: 19.25 kilometer
 Level difference: 2.89 m
 Length: 44.0 m
 Width: 6.10 m
 Gates: Metal
 Years Constructed: 1835–1836, rebuilt 1948
 Project manager: Eng. Wojciech Korczakowski

References

 
 
 

19th-century establishments in Poland
Borki
Augustów County
Buildings and structures in Podlaskie Voivodeship